The 2022 Japanese motorcycle Grand Prix (officially known as the Motul Grand Prix of Japan) was the sixteenth round of the 2022 Grand Prix motorcycle racing season. It was held at the Mobility Resort Motegi in Motegi on 25 September 2022.

Background

Time schedule change 
Unlike the other race weekends, on Friday there was be only one free practice session for each class, with the consequence that the second was scheduled on Saturday morning. The combined classification for access in Q1 and Q2 was determined by the times of only FP1 and FP2 (which will last seventy-five minutes each), as already happened in this championship in the Indonesian Grand Prix. Consequently, the free practice session before MotoGP qualifying became FP3.

Riders' entries 
In the MotoGP class, Takuya Tsuda, initially announced as a wild card with the Suzuki Ecstar Team, replaced the owner Joan Mir still suffering from an ankle injury; Tetsuta Nagashima ran wild for Team HRC. In the Moto2 class, in addition to the replacement of Gabriel Rodrigo in the Pertamina Mandalika SAG Team with the Japanese Taiga Hada, there was the return of Sam Lowes to the Elf Marc VDS Racing Team. In the Moto3 class, in addition to Nicola Carraro replacing Matteo Bertelle in the QJmotor Avintia Racing Team, there was also the replacement of the injured Alberto Surra in the Rivacold Snipers Team with the Japanese Kanta Hamada.

MotoGP Championship standings before the race 
The crash in the previous Grand Prix by Fabio Quartararo, sees the leader of the riders' stand at 211 points and the rapprochement of Francesco Bagnaia and Aleix Espargaró (finished second and third), now 10 and 17 points away respectively. Enea Bastianini, winner of Aragon, is now 48 points behind the top of the standings. Jack Miller is fifth at -77 points from the top. In the constructors' classification, Ducati is arithmetically champion with 346 points; Aprilia overtakes Yamaha in second position (217 the first, 213 the second). Followed by KTM (161 points), Suzuki (134 points) and Honda (100 points). In the team standings, Ducati Lenovo Team is first with 335 points, with a lead of 37 points over Aprilia Racing, 98 over Monster Energy Yamaha MotoGP and Prima Pramac Racing and 112 over Red Bull KTM Factory Racing.

Moto2 Championship standings before the race 
Augusto Fernández increases his lead in the riders' standing after the Aragon Grand Prix: he is now on 214 points, 7 more than Ai Ogura. Arón Canet is third with 177 points, followed by Celestino Vietti with 162 points and Tony Arbolino with 128 points. The constructors' classification states: Kalex (already arithmetically champion) 370 points, Boscoscuro 121 points, MV Agusta 5 points. In the team standings, Red Bull KTM Ajo is first with 337 points, followed 21 points behind by Idemitsu Honda Team Asia. Flexbox HP40 is third with 260 points, ahead of Elf Marc VDS Racing Team and Shimoko GasGas Aspar Team, who have 179 and 173 points respectively.

Moto3 Championship standings before the race 
Izan Guevara's victory in Aragon, combined with the difficulties of Sergio García and Dennis Foggia (finished thirteenth and fourteenth) allows him to increase his advantage in the drivers' classification: the first is at 229 points, with the second and third following him respectively. with 196 and 171 points. Ayumu Sasaki is fourth with 158 points, 3 more than Jaume Masià. In the constructors' classification, Gas Gas (287 points) brings the distances ahead of Honda and KTM to 32 and 41 points. Husqvarna and CFMoto are fourth and fifth with 194 and 110 points respectively. In the team standings, AutoSolar GasGas Aspar Team leads with 425 points, with a large advantage over their rivals: Leopard Racing (299 points), Red Bull KTM Ajo (238 points), Sterilgarda Husqvarna Max (211 points), Red Bull KTM Tech3 (193 points).

Free practice

MotoGP 
In the first session, carried out in the dry, the fastest was Jack Miller, ahead of his teammate Francesco Bagnaia and Fabio Quartararo. In the second session, held in the wet, Marc Márquez set the best time, ahead of his compatriot Jorge Martín and Miller.

Combinated Free Practice 1 and 2 
The top ten riders (written in bold) qualified in Q2.

Qualifying

MotoGP

Moto2

Moto3

Race

MotoGP

Notes:
 – Aleix Espargaró was due to start from sixth place, but was forced to start from the pit lane after suffering mechanical problems and therefore using his spare bike, which left his grid slot vacant.

Moto2

 Manuel González withdrew from the race after suffering from a fractured shoulder sustained during Qualifying.

Moto3

Championship standings after the race
Below are the standings for the top five riders, constructors, and teams after the round.

MotoGP

Riders' Championship standings

Constructors' Championship standings

Teams' Championship standings

Moto2

Riders' Championship standings

Constructors' Championship standings

Teams' Championship standings

Moto3

Riders' Championship standings

Constructors' Championship standings

Teams' Championship standings

References

External links

2022 MotoGP race reports
2022 in Japanese motorsport
2022
September 2022 sports events in Japan